Icelandic passports are issued to citizens of Iceland for the purpose of international travel. Beside serving as proof of Icelandic citizenship, they facilitate the process of securing assistance from Icelandic consular officials abroad (or public officials in the mission of another Nordic country in case an Icelandic consular official is absent).

The passport allows for the freedom of movement in any of the states of EFTA and the EEA. This is because Iceland is a member state of EFTA, and by virtue of it also being a member of the European Economic Area (EEA) and part of the Schengen Area. For travel within the Nordic countries no identity documentation is legally required for Nordic citizens due to the Nordic Passport Union.

History
A new design was put into circulation in May 1987. It featured a dark blue (near-black) cover, laser-printed pages, and a laminated information page.

The first machine-readable Icelandic passports were introduced on 1 June 1999, having a blue cover, a machine-readable strip and improved security features. A hard-plastic page with a biometric chip was added in May 2006, and the validity was temporarily shortened from ten years to five. In June 2013, the chip was relocated to the back cover and the validity restored to ten years.

A new Icelandic passport design was introduced on 1 February 2019, featuring a slightly enlarged Icelandic coat of arms and sans-serif wording on the front cover.

Physical Appearance
Icelandic passports are blue, with the Icelandic coat of arms emblazoned in the centre of the front cover. The words "ÍSLAND" (Icelandic), "ICELAND" (English) and "ISLANDE" (French) are inscribed above the coat of arms and the words "VEGABRÉF" (Icelandic), "PASSPORT" (English) and "PASSEPORT" (French) are inscribed below the coat of arms. Icelandic passports have the standard biometric symbol at the bottom.

Vegabréf, the Icelandic word for passport, literally means "road letter", which was the Scandinavian word for internal passports when such existed in Scandinavia.

Identity Information Page

The Icelandic passport includes the following data:
 Photo of Passport Holder
 Type (PA)
 Code (ISL)
 Passport No.
 Surname
 Given Names
 Nationality
 Height
 Date of Birth
 Personal code number
 Sex
 Place of Birth
 Date of Issue
 Date of Expiry
 Authority

The information page ends with the Machine Readable Zone.

Different spellings of the same name
Personal names containing the special Icelandic letters (ð, þ, æ, ö) are spelled the correct way in the non-machine-readable zone, but are mapped in the machine-readable zone. ð becomes D, þ becomes TH, æ becomes AE, and ö becomes OE. 
Letters with accents are replaced by simple letters (e.g., é → E). This follows the standard for machine-readable passports.

Languages
The data page/information page is printed in Icelandic, English and French.

Visa free travel

Visa requirements for Icelandic citizens are administrative entry restrictions by the authorities of other states placed on citizens of Iceland. As of 3 April 2020, Icelandic citizens had visa-free or visa-on-arrival access to 180 countries and territories, ranking the Icelandic passport 11th in the world in terms of travel freedom (tied with Latvian and Slovenian passports) according to the Henley Passport Index.

As a member of the European Free Trade Association (EFTA), Icelandic citizens have freedom of movement to live and work in other EFTA countries in accordance with the EFTA convention. Moreover, by virtue of Iceland's membership of the European Economic Area (EEA), Icelandic citizens also enjoy freedom of movement within all EEA member states. The Citizens’ Rights Directive defines the right of free movement for citizens of the EEA, and all EFTA and EU citizens are not only visa-exempt but are legally entitled to enter and reside in each other's countries.

Other identity documents
Inside Iceland and the other Nordic countries, an Icelandic identity card or driving licence is usually sufficient for personal identification. They do not state citizenship and therefore are not usable in most cases as travel documentation outside of the Nordic countries. The Icelandic identity card is called "Nafnskírteini" ("name certificate"). Most people do not have it and use driving licences instead.

See also
Visa requirements for Icelandic citizens
Passports of the EFTA member states

External links
 EU legislation: Council Regulation (EC) No 539/2001 of 15 March 2001 listing the third countries whose nationals must be in possession of visas when crossing the external borders and those whose nationals are exempt from that requirement

References 

Iceland
European Economic Area
European Free Trade Association